El Dinouda Digdighei is a coastal village in the north-central Mudug region of Somalia.

References
El Dinouda Digdighei

Populated places in Mudug